This is a sortable list of Bach cantatas, the cantatas composed by Johann Sebastian Bach. His almost 200 extant cantatas are among his important vocal compositions. Many are known to be lost. Bach composed both church cantatas, most of them for specific occasions of the liturgical year of the Lutheran Church, and secular cantatas.

Bach's earliest cantatas were written possibly from 1707, the year he moved to Mühlhausen, although he may have begun composing them at his previous post in Arnstadt. He began regular composition of church cantatas in Weimar between 1708 and 1717, writing one cantata per month. In his next position in Köthen, he composed no church cantatas, but secular cantatas for the court. In his first year there, starting after Trinity, Bach regularly composed a new cantata every week in his Bach's first cantata cycle. The following year, he followed the format, now basing each cantata on a Lutheran hymn in the chorale cantata cycle. He was less rigid over the following years, but still produced new compositions in his third to fifth years, the Picander cycle of 1728–29, and late works known up to 1745.

The list includes both extant cantatas and, as far as known, lost cantatas. It is sortable by the cantata number which equals the number in the Bach-Werke-Verzeichnis (BWV), by title, by occasion during the liturgical year, the year of composition and date of first performance, as far as known. The scoring is provided, grouped by singers and groups of instruments. Colouring shows which cantatas are not extant church cantatas and which works were not even composed by Bach, but attributed to him in the past. A link to the free score of the Bach Gesellschaft in the International Music Score Library Project (IMSLP) is provided if available.

Abbreviations 

The abbreviations of performers are given for solo singers, choir (typically SATB), brass instruments (plus timpani), woodwinds, strings, keyboard and basso continuo. The basso continuo consists of a group of players, depending upon the scoring of the cantata and the performance location. For example, a bassoon is typically playing when other wind instruments are called for, an organ may be played in church, a harpsichord will be used in secular surroundings.

List of cantatas 

The list follows the Bach-Werke-Verzeichnis and contains all sacred cantatas (1–197, 199), secular cantatas (198, 201–215), fragments (50, 80b, 216, 224) and works formerly attributed to Bach (15, 53, 141–142, 160, 189, 217–223), lost cantatas (36a, 66a, 70a, 80a, 120b and others), as well as works which are no longer considered cantatas (11, 53, 118). Most of the church cantatas are composed for occasions of the Lutheran liturgical year and related to prescribed readings. The Sundays after Trinity are numbered using roman numerals (for example "Trinity II" for the second Sunday after Trinity). The high holidays Christmas, Easter and Pentecost were celebrated for three days, indicated by numbers for the second and third day, for example "Easter 3" for the third day of Easter. Keyboard instruments are only listed for specific solo parts, not as part of the continuo group. If more than one part was composed for one instrument, the number is given, for example "3Tr" for three trumpets.

Literature 
 BWV Bach-Werke-Verzeichnis, Breitkopf & Härtel, 1998
 NBA Neue Bach-Ausgabe, Bärenreiter, 1954 to 2007
 Z. Philip Ambrose Texts of the Complete Vocal Works with English Translation and Commentary University of Vermont 2005–2011
 Walter F. Bischof. The Bach Cantatas University of Alberta 2003–2010
 Alfred Dürr: Johann Sebastian Bach: Die Kantaten. Bärenreiter, Kassel 1999,  (in German)
 Alfred Dürr: The Cantatas of J.S. Bach, Oxford University Press, 2006. 
 Werner Neumann: Handbuch der Kantaten J.S.Bachs, 1947, 5th ed. 1984, 
 Martin Petzold: Bach-Kommentar. Theologisch-musikwissenschaftliche Kommentierung der geistlichen Vokalwerke Johann Sebastian Bachs.
 Vol. I: Die geistlichen Kantaten des 1. bis 27. Trinitatis-Sonntages, Kassel/Stuttgart 2004.
 Vol. II: Die geistlichen Kantaten vom 1. Advent bis zum Trinitatisfest, Kassel/Stuttgart 2007.
 Vol. III in preparation.
 Reginald Lane Poole. "A List of Church Cantatas in Presumed Order of Production" pp. 131–138 in Sebastian Bach. London: Sampson Low, Marston, Searle, & Rivington, 1882.
 Hans-Joachim Schulze: Die Bach-Kantaten: Einführungen zu sämtlichen Kantaten Johann Sebastian Bachs Leipzig: Evangelische Verlags-Anstalt; Stuttgart: Carus-Verlag 2006 (Edition Bach-Archiv Leipzig)  (EVA),  (in German)
 Craig Smith: programme notes, Emmanuel Music
 Charles Sanford Terry. "Appendix II: The Church Cantatas Arranged Chronologically", pp. 163–224 in Johann Sebastian Bach: His Life, Art, and Work. Translated from the German of Johann Nikolaus Forkel. With notes and appendices. London: Constable; New York: Harcourt, Brace and Howe. 1920. (e-version at Gutenberg.org)
 Christoph Wolff/Ton Koopman: Die Welt der Bach-Kantaten Verlag J.B. Metzler, Stuttgart, Weimar 2006  (in German)
 Philippe and Gérard Zwang. Guide pratique des cantates de Bach. Second revised and augmented edition. L'Harmattan, 2005.

External links 
 Bach Cantatas Website
 Numerical and alphabetical lists of cantatas by J. S. Bach (1685-1750) and various related works

 
 
Cantatas, List of